20th CFCA Awards
December 18, 2008

Best Film: 
 WALL-E 

The 21st Chicago Film Critics Association Awards, given by the CFCA on December 18, 2008, honored the best in film for 2008. Disney/Pixar's WALL-E was the most successful film in the ceremony, winning four awards, including Best Film, out of five nominations. Slumdog Millionaire won three awards, while The Dark Knight and Let the Right One In won two awards each.

Winners and nominees

Best Actor
Mickey Rourke – The Wrestler
 Clint Eastwood – Gran Torino
 Richard Jenkins – The Visitor
 Frank Langella – Frost/Nixon
 Sean Penn – Milk

Best Actress
Anne Hathaway – Rachel Getting Married
 Sally Hawkins – Happy-Go-Lucky
 Angelina Jolie – Changeling
 Melissa Leo – Frozen River
 Meryl Streep – Doubt

Best Animated Film
WALL-E
 Bolt
 Kung Fu Panda
 The Tale of Despereaux
 Waltz with Bashir

Best Cinematography
The Dark Knight – Wally Pfister Australia – Mandy Walker
 The Curious Case of Benjamin Button – Claudio Miranda
 The Fall – Colin Watkinson
 Slumdog Millionaire – Anthony Dod Mantle

Best DirectorDanny Boyle – Slumdog Millionaire
 David Fincher – The Curious Case of Benjamin Button
 Christopher Nolan – The Dark Knight
 Andrew Stanton – WALL-E
 Gus Van Sant – Milk

Best Documentary Film
Man on Wire
 American Teen
 Dear Zachary: A Letter to a Son About His Father
 I.O.U.S.A.
 Standard Operating Procedure

Best Film
WALL-E
 The Curious Case of Benjamin Button
 The Dark Knight
 Milk
 Slumdog Millionaire

Best Foreign Language Film
Let the Right One In (Låt den rätte komma in), Sweden The Band's Visit (Bikur Ha-Tizmoret), Israel
 Che, France, Spain, & USA
 A Christmas Tale (Un conte de Noël), France
 I've Loved You So Long (Il y a longtemps que je t'aime), France

Best Original ScoreWALL-E – Thomas Newman The Curious Case of Benjamin Button – Alexandre Desplat
 The Dark Knight – Hans Zimmer and James Newton Howard
 Milk – Danny Elfman
 Slumdog Millionaire – A. R. Rahman

Best Screenplay – AdaptedSlumdog Millionaire – Simon Beaufoy The Curious Case of Benjamin Button – Eric Roth
 The Dark Knight – Jonathan Nolan and Christopher Nolan
 Doubt – John Patrick Shanley
 Frost/Nixon – Peter Morgan

Best Screenplay – OriginalWALL-E – Andrew Stanton and Jim Reardon In Bruges – Martin McDonagh
 Milk – Dustin Lance Black
 Rachel Getting Married – Jenny Lumet
 Synecdoche, New York – Charlie Kaufman

Best Supporting ActorHeath Ledger – The Dark Knight (posthumously)
 Robert Downey Jr. – Tropic Thunder
 Philip Seymour Hoffman – Doubt
 Bill Irwin – Rachel Getting Married
 Michael Shannon – Revolutionary Road

Best Supporting Actress
Kate Winslet – The Reader
 Amy Adams – Doubt
 Penélope Cruz – Vicky Cristina Barcelona
 Viola Davis – Doubt
 Rosemarie DeWitt – Rachel Getting Married

Most Promising Filmmaker
Tomas Alfredson – Let the Right One In (Låt den rätte komma in)
 Lance Hammer – Ballast
 Courtney Hunt – Frozen River
 Martin McDonagh – In Bruges
 Steve McQueen – Hunger

Most Promising Performer
Dev Patel – Slumdog Millionaire
 Russell Brand – Forgetting Sarah Marshall
 David Kross – The Reader
 Lina Leandersson – Let the Right One In (Låt den rätte komma in)
 Brandon Walters – Australia

References
 https://web.archive.org/web/20100224070822/http://www.chicagofilmcritics.org/index.php?option=com_content&view=article&id=62&Itemid=60

 2008
2008 film awards